Mesoprionus persicus is a species of beetle in the Prioninae subfamily, that is endemic to Zagros, Iran. They feed on Quercus brantii.

References

Beetles described in 1850
Endemic fauna of Iran
Prioninae